The Australian Energy Regulator (AER) is the regulator of the wholesale electricity and gas markets in Australia. It is part of the Australian Competition & Consumer Commission and enforces the rules established by the Australian Energy Market Commission.

The AER was established in July 2005. The next year all 13 bodies previously responsible for energy regulation had transferred responsibility to the AER. Decisions made by the regulator are subject to appeal.

Functions
The AER's current functions are focused on regulating the natural monopoly transmission and distribution sectors of the national electricity market, monitoring the wholesale electricity market and enforcing electricity market rules. The AER's regulatory functions and powers are conferred upon it by the national electricity law and the national electricity rules.

Under the national electricity law and national electricity rules, the AER's key responsibilities at the present time include:

 regulating the revenues of transmission network service providers by establishing revenue caps 
 regulating the revenues of distribution network service providers 
 monitoring the electricity wholesale market 
 monitoring compliance with the national electricity law, national electricity rules and national electricity regulations 
 investigating breaches or possible breaches of provisions of the national electricity law, rules and regulations 
 instituting and conducting enforcement proceedings against relevant market participants 
 establishing service standards for electricity transmission network service providers  
 establishing ring-fencing guidelines for business operations with respect to regulated transmission services 
 exempting network service providers from registration.

Staff
The AER board currently has five members who are statutory appointments. Part IIIAA of the Competition and Consumer Act provides that two of the members of the AER must be chosen by the Commonwealth, with three of the members chosen by the States and Territories.

Clare Savage is the chair of the AER, and Jim Cox is the deputy chair. The remaining members are Eric Groom, Catriona Lowe and Justin Oliver.  The chief executive officer of the AER is Elizabeth Develin.

See also
 Australian Energy Market Commission
 Australian Energy Market Operator
 Energy policy of Australia
 Australian Competition & Consumer Commission

References

External links
 Australian Energy Regulator

Commonwealth Government agencies of Australia
Energy in Australia
2005 establishments in Australia
Government agencies established in 2005
Energy regulatory authorities
Regulatory authorities of Australia